Andromachus, a cavalry general, was commander of the Eleans in 364 BCE. During the Arcadians' campaign against Elis, while the Arcadians were encamped between Cyllene and the capital, Andromachus launched an attack against them. His army was defeated and he committed suicide as a consequence.

References

Ancient Greek generals
Ancient Eleans
4th-century BC Greek people
Ancient Greeks who committed suicide
Year of birth unknown
Year of death unknown